Neblinaea is a genus of flowering plants in the family Asteraceae.

Species
The only known species is Neblinaea promontoriorum, native to the State of Amazonas in Brazil and to the State of Amazonas in Venezuela.

References

Monotypic Asteraceae genera
Flora of the Amazon
Stifftioideae